Nery Antonio Brenes Cárdenas, (born September 25, 1985) is a Costa Rican sprinter.
He is one of Costa Rica's most prominent track and field athletes and reached the semi-finals at the 400 m sprint in the 2008 Olympic Games in Beijing.

Brenes won the gold medal at the 2012 IAAF World Indoor Championships in Istanbul, setting a new national and championship record. "Brenes improved his personal mark by approximately one second, something nobody expected on a championship, taking the gold medal", cited his personal trainer and motivator Andrés Oro Fijo Calderón. He has participated in major events like the 2007 World Championships in Athletics in Osaka, Japan, and achieved a 4th-place finish at the 2008 IAAF World Indoor Championships in Valencia, Spain. He also finished in 3rd place at the 2008 ÅF Golden League meet in Oslo, Norway.

Personal bests

Outdoor
200 m: 20.20 s – Rio de Janeiro, 16 August 2016
400 m: 44.60 s – Madrid, 23 June 2016

Indoor
400 m: 45.11 s – Istanbul, 10 March 2012

International competitions

References

External links
 
 
 "Against the Odds: Nery Brenes", BBC, July 21, 2008
Tilastopaja biography

1985 births
Living people
Costa Rican male sprinters
Olympic athletes of Costa Rica
Athletes (track and field) at the 2008 Summer Olympics
Athletes (track and field) at the 2012 Summer Olympics
Athletes (track and field) at the 2016 Summer Olympics
Athletes (track and field) at the 2011 Pan American Games
Athletes (track and field) at the 2019 Pan American Games
World Athletics Championships athletes for Costa Rica
People from Limón Province
Pan American Games gold medalists for Costa Rica
Pan American Games medalists in athletics (track and field)
Central American and Caribbean Games gold medalists for Costa Rica
Competitors at the 2010 Central American and Caribbean Games
Central American Games gold medalists for Costa Rica
Central American Games medalists in athletics
World Athletics Indoor Championships winners
IAAF Continental Cup winners
Central American and Caribbean Games medalists in athletics
Medalists at the 2011 Pan American Games